St Leonards Salt Lagoon is a former marine embayment, isolated by coastal deposition from Port Phillip Bay, at St Leonards, Victoria, Australia. It is a Victorian Nature Reserve.

References

Lakes of Victoria (Australia)
Nature reserves in Victoria (Australia)
Port Phillip
Bellarine Peninsula